Bincombe is a small village, or hamlet, and civil parish in Dorset, England,   north of Weymouth. The main road running through the village is Icen Lane. The civil parish, which includes a small part of the settlement of Broadwey to the west, had a population of 514 in the 2011 census.

Holy Trinity Church dates from the early 13th century.

Large military camps for the observation of the English Channel were formed on the hills in this parish in the reign of George III, and two deserters, in trying to escape with details of the different camps, were captured in the English Channel, tried by court martial and shot on Bincombe Down. Their remains are buried in the churchyard, where the stone can still be seen.  The same incident, differently interpreted, forms the basis of Thomas Hardy's short story, The Melancholy Hussar of the German Legion.

The Master and Fellows of Caius College, Cambridge, are the principal landowners.

References

External links
 
 Bincombe local history

Villages in Dorset